The Puffin Prize for Creative Citizenship is an American award given jointly by Type Media Center (a nonprofit media organization previously associated with The Nation magazine) and the Puffin Foundation. The annual $100,000 award honors artists and others who have "challenged the status quo through distinctive, courageous, imaginative and socially responsible work of significance." The prize is intended to "encourage the recipients to continue their work, and to inspire others to challenge the prevailing orthodoxies they face in their careers." The inaugural award was in 2001.

The Puffin Prize for Creative Citizenship was renamed in 2017.  It was formerly known as the Puffin/Nation Prize for Creative Citizenship.

Winners
2001 Robert Parris Moses
2002 Dolores Huerta
2003 David Protess
2004 Barbara Ehrenreich
2005 Jonathan Kozol
2006 Amy Goodman
2007 Michael Ratner
2008 Van Jones
2009 Jim Hightower
2010 Bill McKibben
2010 Cecile Richards
2011 Tony Kushner
2012 Benjamin Todd Jealous
2013 Barry W. Lynn
2014 Frances Fox Piven
2015 William J. Barber II
2016 Bryan Stevenson
2017 Colin Kaepernick
2018 Parkland student activists
2019 The Sunrise Movement
2020 Desmond Meade
2021 The National Network for Abortion Funds

References

External links
 Puffin Prize for Creative Citizenship, official website.

Awards established in 2001
Lifetime achievement awards